is a Japanese professional footballer who plays as a forward for Nankatsu SC. Omae has made several appearances for Japan’s under 19 national team.

Career statistics

Club
.

1Includes Emperor's Cup and DFB-Pokal.

2Includes J. League Cup.

References

External links
Profile at Omiya Ardija
Profile at Nankatsu SC

1989 births
Living people
Association football forwards
Association football people from Kanagawa Prefecture
Japanese footballers
Japan youth international footballers
J1 League players
J2 League players
Bundesliga players
2. Bundesliga players
Shimizu S-Pulse players
Omiya Ardija players
Fortuna Düsseldorf players
Thespakusatsu Gunma players
Kyoto Sanga FC players
Nankatsu SC players
Japanese expatriate footballers
Japanese expatriate sportspeople in Germany
Expatriate footballers in Germany